The Saint Lucia FA Cup is the top knockout tournament of the Saint Lucia football.

Winners
 1998  :  Mabouya Valley bt Dennery All Stars
 1999  : Roots Alley Ballers (Vieux Fort)  5-0 Young Stars (Anse-la-Raye)
 2000  : Rovers United (Mabouya Valley)    3-2     Northern United (Gros Islet)     [aet]
 2001  : VSADC (Castries)                  2-1     Roots Alley Ballers (Vieux Fort) [asdet]
 2002  : VSADC (Castries)                  1-1 Cimpex Orion                     [aet, 9-8 pen]
 2003  :  18 Plus (Dennery)                 2-1     Pioneers FC (Castries)           [asdet]
 2004  : Northern United (Gros Islet)       bt      Rovers United (Mabouya Valley)
 2005/06  : Elite Challengers (Soufrière)     1-1     Canaries (Canaries)              [aet, 3-2 pen]
 2007  : Northern United (Gros Islet)                   5-0 Orion
 2008/09 : Dennery Aux-Lyons 4-1 GSYO
 2009/10 : final between Soufrière YO and Young Strikers abandoned
 2013  : Marchand 1-1 Mabouya                          [aet, 4-3 pen]

References

Football competitions in Saint Lucia
Football cup competitions in Saint Lucia
National association football cups